Yvan Eyike (born 31 March 1996) is a Cameroonian professional footballer. In 2017, he played for Naftan Novopolotsk.

References

External links 
 
 

1996 births
Living people
Cameroonian footballers
Cameroonian expatriate footballers
Expatriate footballers in Belarus
Cameroonian expatriate sportspeople in Belarus
Association football defenders
FC Naftan Novopolotsk players
Eding Sport FC players